Daviesia eremaea is a species of flowering plant in the family Fabaceae and is endemic to central Australia. It is an erect, glabrous, multi-stemmed shrub with needle-like, more or less sharply-pointed phyllodes, and yellow and red flowers.

Description

Taxonomy and naming
Daviesia eremaea was first formally described in 1980 by Michael Crisp in the Journal of the Adelaide Botanic Gardens. The specific epithet (eremaea) refers to the desert habitat of this species.

Distribution and habitat
Daviesia eremaea grows on sand dunes in grassland, sometimes on mountain slopes in mallee from near Alice Springs in the Northern Territory, west to the Pilbara and Great Victoria Desert regions of Western Australia and south to near the border with South Australia.

Conservation status
This species of pea is classified as "not threatened" by the Western Australian Government Department of Biodiversity, Conservation and Attractions.

References

eremaea
Eudicots of Western Australia
Flora of the Northern Territory
Plants described in 1980
Taxa named by Michael Crisp